The Taoyuan Hakka Culture Hall is a Hakka cultural center in Longtan District, Taoyuan City, Taiwan.

History
The hall was built in 2007.

Exhibitions
The hall mainly displays the exhibition of Hakka culture, antiques and introduces all kinds of Hakka activities.

Events
The hall regularly holds exhibitions, such as the 2016 Hakka Tung Blossom Festival in Taoyuan etc. The hall also holds various Hakka language-related events to promote the use of the language among youths and offer financial incentives to youths who wish to take the language test.

See also
 List of museums in Taiwan

References

2007 establishments in Taiwan
Buildings and structures completed in 2007
Buildings and structures in Taoyuan City
Cultural centers in Taiwan
Hakka culture in Taiwan
Tourist attractions in Taoyuan City